Ponnaniyathi is a 1988 Indian Malayalam film, directed by R Krishnamoorthy and produced by R Krishnamoorthy.

Cast
Nizhalgal Ravi

References

External links
 

1988 films
1980s Malayalam-language films